Rajan may refer to:
Raja
Rajan (name)

See also
Rajon (disambiguation)